Valuysky Uyezd (Валуйский уезд) was one of the subdivisions of the Voronezh Governorate of the Russian Empire. It was situated in the southwestern part of the governorate. Its administrative centre was Valuyki.

Demographics
At the time of the Russian Empire Census of 1897, Valuysky Uyezd had a population of 188,113. Of these, 51.1% spoke Ukrainian, 48.6% Russian, 0.1% Romani and 0.1% Yiddish as their native language.

References

 
Uezds of Voronezh Governorate
Voronezh Governorate